Kazimierz Władysław Matuszny (born 4 March 1960 in Milówka) is a Polish politician. He was elected to the Sejm on 25 September 2005, getting 9,033 votes in 27 Bielsko-Biała district as a candidate from the Law and Justice list.

See also
 Members of Polish Sejm 2005-2007

External links
 Kazimierz Matuszny - parliamentary page - includes declarations of interest, voting record, and transcripts of speeches.

1960 births
Living people
People from Żywiec County
Members of the Polish Sejm 2005–2007
Members of the Polish Sejm 2007–2011
Members of the Polish Sejm 2015–2019
Members of the Polish Sejm 2019–2023
Law and Justice politicians